Matilda Ziegler (born 23 July 1964) is an English actress, best known for her roles as Donna Ludlow in EastEnders, Irma Gobb in Mr. Bean, and Pearl Pratt in Lark Rise to Candleford.

Television and film career
Ziegler's first screen role was in her early twenties, during 1987–89; she appeared in the BBC One soap opera EastEnders, playing Donna Ludlow, the illegitimate daughter of series regular Kathy Beale. Donna contended with prostitution, an attempted gang rape, heroin addiction and finally suicide (dying of a heroin overdose). The final death scenes of Ziegler's character, who had choked to death on her own vomit, have been hailed as one of the most powerful anti-drug images ever screened on the programme. She left EastEnders in April 1989.

In the early 1990s, Ziegler starred in the ITV comedy, Mr. Bean, where she played multiple characters, especially a three-episode stint as Irma Gobb, the title character's long-suffering girlfriend. She reprised her role as Irma Gobb, voicing her in Mr. Bean: The Animated Series, from 2002 to 2004, and in the revived series from 2015 to 2019.

Other television credits include: Lark Rise to Candleford (2008–2010) in which she played the part of Pearl Pratt, in the BBC adaptation of Flora Thompson's novel; Harbour Lights (1999); Where the Heart Is (2000); Holby City (2003); An Unsuitable Job for a Woman (1998); The Bill (2003), and Home, alongside Anthony Sher in an adaptation of J.G. Ballard's novel.

Ziegler played Ruth, wife of car salesman Toni, in the BBC sitcom Swiss Toni (2003–04). She also appeared in the BAFTA Television Award winning drama, Sex Traffic (2004). In 2005, she played Christine Miller in the fourth series of The Inspector Lynley Mysteries, and in 2007, she guest starred in the BBC One daytime medical drama Doctors. She also appeared in Outnumbered, Lewis (in the episode 'The Soul of Genius', 2012),  Death in Paradise (2013), and Vera (in the episode "Young Gods", 2013).

In 2015, she appeared in an episode of Foyle's War, and in series 4 episode of Call the Midwife. In 2020 she appeared in a second season episode of The Alienist, and appeared in two episodes of The Girlfriend Experience in 2021.

Ziegler's film roles include Decadence (1994), Jilting Joe (1998), City Slacker (2012), and The Rhythm Section (2019) where she played Blake Lively's mother.

Stage and radio career
Ziegler has appeared in many stage productions, including Twelfth Night for the Royal Shakespeare Company (2001); the theatrical version of Mr. Bean; Women Laughing at the Royal Court Theatre; Volpone, Inadmissible Evidence and Machinal, all at the National Theatre; Featuring Loretta and The Memory of Water – both at the Hampstead Theatre; The Lady from the Sea, Lyric Hammersmith/West Yorkshire Playhouse (1994: TMA Award, nomination for Laurence Olivier Award) and also starred as Sheila Birling in Stephen Daldry's award winning production of An Inspector Calls at the Aldwych Theatre and for the production's Australian tour, along with Lady Sneerwell in Deborah Warner's 2011 production of The School for Scandal at the Barbican Centre.

She most recently appeared in Downstate in Chicago and at the National Theatre, a co production with Steppenwolf Theatre Company. Her radio work has included playing Dr Ruth Anderson in BBC Radio 4, Rigor Mortis (2004–06). She also featured in Giles Wemmbley-Hogg Goes Off in 2010, and as Princess Theresa of Liechtenstein in the fourth series of Cabin Pressure in 2013, a role she reprised for the show's final episode in 2014. She had previously played an air traffic controller and a paramedic in the second episode of the first series.

Personal life
In July 2004, Ziegler married actor Louis Hilyer; the couple have three children.

Filmography

References

External links

1964 births
Living people
Actresses from Kent
English people of German descent
English soap opera actresses
English stage actresses
English television actresses
English voice actresses
People from Ashford, Kent
20th-century English actresses
21st-century English actresses